The Old Plantation is an American folk art watercolor likely painted in the late 18th century on a South Carolina plantation. It is notable for its early date, its credible, non-stereotypical depiction of slaves on the North American mainland, and the fact that the slaves are shown pursuing their own interests. The artist has been identified as South Carolina slaveholder John Rose, and the painting may depict his plantation in what is now Beaufort County.

Description and interpretation

The painting depicts African American slaves between two small outbuildings of a plantation sited on a broad river. The Old Plantation is the only known painting of its era that depicts African Americans by themselves, concerned only with each other, though its central activity remains obscure. Some writers have speculated that the painting depicts a marriage ceremony, with the attendant tradition of jumping the broom. However, scholars have suggested that the subjects are performing a secular dance: western African dance patterns traditionally include sticks and a variety of body positions. The headdresses pictured are of West African origin.

The painting features two male musicians, one of whom is playing a stringed instrument that resembles a Yoruba molo; the body of this instrument seems to be a hollow gourd. The molo is a precursor to the banjo, and this is the earliest known American painting to picture a banjo-like instrument. The second musician is playing a percussion instrument that resembles a Yoruba gudugudu.  Most likely, he is playing an upended gourd with sticks.  The two women hold what look like scarves, but are actually sheguras, rattles made of a gourd enclosed in a net of variable length into which hard objects have been woven.

Artist and provenance
For decades the identity of the artist was unknown, as was the painting's provenance prior to 1935, when it was purchased by Holger Cahill from Mary E. Lyles of Columbia, South Carolina. However, in 2010, Susan P. Shames, a librarian at Colonial Williamsburg, published a book titled The Old Plantation: The Artist Revealed in which she argues the artist was South Carolina plantation owner John Rose. Shames further suggests that the image depicts slaves on Rose's plantation in what is now Beaufort County, South Carolina, or one nearby.

In 1775, Rose was named Clerk of the Court of Common Pleas in Beaufort District, an appointment implying his educated status and familiarity with governing officials. By 1795, he owned a lot in the town of Beaufort, as well as a rural, 813-acre tract on the Coosaw River in Prince William Parish. He employed slave labor to farm the latter property. At least fifty of these slaves have been identified by name, and he likely owned others. Shames suggests the slaves and plantation depicted in the image were Rose's own. However, the broad river in the middle ground raises questions about whether Rose owned property on both sides of this natural boundary and, thus, whether he depicted his own dwelling and outbuildings in the background, or a neighbor's. Rose moved to the Dorchester area in present-day Colleton County in 1795, and he died in 1820 in Charleston after a fall from a horse.

In his will, Rose left his watercolor of dancing slaves to his son-in-law, Thomas Davis Stall (1770–1848). According to Shames, it remained in the family for more than a hundred years, until it was finally sold at an auction of the estate of Rose Rowan Ellis Copes (1846–1927) of Orangeburg, South Carolina, probably in 1928 or 1929. It was bought either by an unidentified interim dealer or by Mary Earle Lyles (b. 1878) of Columbia. It was certainly in Lyles' possession by 1935, when it was purchased by Holger Cahill, acting as agent for Abby Aldrich Rockefeller. According to Lyles, however, it was painted on a plantation between Charleston and Orangeburg. A watermark on the paper has been identified as that used by the English papermaker James Whatman II (1741–1798) between 1777 and 1794.

Rockefeller and Cahill transferred the painting to Williamsburg, Virginia to be part of the Rockefeller collection at the Ludwell-Paradise House. It was later gifted to Colonial Williamsburg. The painting is currently held by the Abby Aldrich Rockefeller Folk Art Museum in Williamsburg.

References

Works cited
 .
 .
 
 
 .
 .
 .
 

American folk art
American paintings
Black people in art
Dance in art
Musical instruments in art
18th-century paintings
Southern art
Colonial Williamsburg
Slavery in art
Works about American slavery